Talparia exusta is a species of sea snail, a cowry, a marine gastropod mollusk in the family Cypraeidae, the cowries.

Description

Distribution
This species is distributed in the Red Sea and along Eritrea and Somalia.

References

Cypraeidae
Gastropods described in 1832